Kosrae State Department of Education (KDOE) is an agency of Kosrae State, Federated States of Micronesia that operates public schools. It is headquartered in Tofol.

Schools
Kosrae High School (Tofol, Lelu) is the sole high school.

Elementary schools:
 Lelu Elementary School - Lelu Island, Lelu Municipality
 Malem Elementary School
 Sansrihk Elementary School - Lelu Municipality
 Tafunsak Elementary School
 Utwe Elementary School
 Walung Elementary School - Tafunsak Municipality

See also
 Education in the Federated States of Micronesia

References

External links
Kosrae State Department of Education
 
Education in the Federated States of Micronesia
Kosrae